Mount Isa Airport  is an airport serving the western Queensland city of Mount Isa, Australia. It is served by a variety of scheduled regional airlines, with flights to Brisbane, Townsville and Cairns as well as several other regional centres.

The Royal Flying Doctor Service has one of its nine Queensland bases at Mount Isa Airport.

Since 2005 the airport has been owned by Queensland Airports Limited, which also owns Townsville Airport, Longreach Airport and Gold Coast Airport.

In the 2010–11 financial year, Mount Isa Airport handled 217,525 passengers, a 25.1% increase over the previous year.

In 2019, the airport was a base for relief efforts for the North West Queensland floods.

Facilities 

Airlines and destinations

Statistics 
Mount Isa Airport was ranked 30th in Australia for the number of revenue passengers served in financial year 2010–2011.

Accidents and incidents

On 22 September 1966 a Vickers Viscount aircraft departed from Mount Isa Airport with twenty passengers for a flight to Brisbane via Longreach. Forty-four minutes after takeoff a fire started in one of the engines. The fire spread to the fuel tank and weakened the wing structure so that a large part of the left wing broke away. All on board were killed. It remains the fifth-worst accident in Australia's civil aviation history.

See also 
 List of airports in Queensland

References

External links
 Mount Isa Airport, official site

Airports in Queensland
North West Queensland
Buildings and structures in Mount Isa